Jean Banières was an 18th-century French physicist and philosopher.

A zealous Cartesian, he was sceptical about Voltaire's Newtonian theories on light and colours.

Works

References 

1700 births
18th-century deaths
18th-century French physicists
18th-century French philosophers